Mississippi Highway 311 (MS 311) is a state highway located in Marshall County, Mississippi, United States. The route runs  from MS 7 in Holly Springs north to U.S. Route 72 (US 72) in Mount Pleasant. The route is a two-lane undivided road its entire length and passes through rural areas. MS 311 was designated onto its current alignment in 1957, and was fully paved from a gravel road by the 1960s.

Route description

MS 311 begins at an intersection with MS 7 in the northern part of Holly Springs, heading northwest on two-lane undivided Mount Pleasant Road. The route passes through wooded areas with some homes and businesses as it comes to an intersection with the Holly Springs Bypass and makes a left turn to continue to the northwest and leaves the city. Upon leaving Holly Springs, the road continues through forested areas with some farm fields and residences. Farther north, the highway reaches the community of Mount Pleasant. MS 311 passes a few homes and businesses within Mount Pleasant before reaching its northern terminus at the US 72 intersection. At this point, the road continues north as Rossville Road. MS 311 is legally defined in Mississippi Code § 65-3-3.

History
MS 311 was designated in 1957 for a gravel road connecting Holly Springs to Mt. Pleasant. By 1960, the route was paved except for a small portion halfway between Holly Springs and Mt. Pleasant. In 1965, the remaining portion of MS 311 was paved.

Major intersections

See also

 List of state highways in Mississippi

References

External links

311
Transportation in Marshall County, Mississippi